Events in the year 1857 in Mexico

Incumbents

President and Cabinet
President: Ignacio Comonfort
Interior Secretary (SEGOB): José María Lafragua/Ignacio de la Llave/Jesús Terán Peredo/ José María Cortés y Esparza/Plutarco Elías Calles

Governors
 Aguascalientes: Jesús Santiago Vidaurri Peredo
 Chiapas: Ángel Albino Corzo
 Chihuahua: 
 Coahuila: Santiago Vidaurri
 Colima: Manuel Álvarez/José Washington/José Silverio Núñez
 Durango:  
 Guanajuato: 
 Guerrero: 
 Jalisco: Anastasio Parrodi/Jesús Leandro Camarena/José Silverio Núñez
 State of Mexico:  
 Michoacán: 
 Nuevo León: Santiago Vidaurri
 Oaxaca: 
 Puebla: 
 Querétaro: Silvestre Méndez/Sabino Flores/José María Arteaga/Manuel Montes Navarrete
 San Luis Potosí: 
 Sinaloa: 
 Sonora: 
 Tabasco: 
 Tamaulipas: Santiago Vidaurri
 Veracruz: Manuel Gutiérrez Zamora/José de Emparán/Manuel Gutiérrez Zamora
 Yucatán: 
 Zacatecas:

Events
February 5 – ratification of the Federal Constitution of the United Mexican States of 1857
April 1–8 – Reform War: Crabb Massacre

Births

Deaths

 
Years of the 19th century in Mexico
1857 establishments in Mexico